Mima Jaušovec and Virginia Ruzici were the defending champions but lost in the second round to Sherry Acker and Anne Smith.

Betty Stöve and Wendy Turnbull won in the final 3–6, 7–5, 6–4 against Françoise Dürr and Virginia Wade.

Seeds

Draw

Finals

Top half

Bottom half

References

External links
1979 French Open – Women's draws and results at the International Tennis Federation

Women's Doubles
French Open by year – Women's doubles
1979 in women's tennis
1979 in French women's sport